Bernard McNally (birth unknown) is a Welsh former professional rugby league footballer who played in the 1950s.

International honours
Bernard McNally represented Combined Nationalities in the 15-19 defeat by France at Stade de Gerland, Lyon on Sunday 3 January 1954 and played right-, i.e. number 12 for Wales while at Rochdale Hornets in the 22-23 defeat by France at Stade Vélodrome, Marseille on Sunday 13 December 1953.

References

Living people
Combined Nationalities rugby league team players
Place of birth missing (living people)
Rochdale Hornets players
Rugby league second-rows
Wales national rugby league team players
Welsh rugby league players
Year of birth missing (living people)